The 2013 Asian Junior Badminton Championships is an Asia continental junior championships to crown the best U-19 badminton players across Asia. It was held in Kota Kinabalu, Malaysia from 7–14 July 2013.

Tournament
The 2013 Asian Junior Badminton Championships organized by the Sabah  Badminton Association, Badminton Association of Malaysia, and Badminton Asia Confederation. This tournament consists of mixed team competition, which was held from  7–10 July, as well as the five individual events started from 10–14 July.

Venue
This tournament was held at Likas Indoor Stadium in Kota Kinabalu, Sabah, Malaysia.

Medalists
In the mixed team event, China claim the title after defeat South Korea with the score 3–1. In the individuals event, China ensure two titles after won the men's and women's doubles event. Malaysia, Japan, and South Korea seize a title by winning the men's singles, women's singles and mixed doubles events respectively.

Medal table

References

External links 
Team Event at Tournamentsoftware.com
Individual Event at Tournamentsoftware.com

 
Badminton Asia Junior Championships
Asian Junior Badminton Championships
Asian Junior Badminton Championships
Youth sport in Malaysia
2013 in youth sport